Stenåldern kan börja is the fourth studio album by bob hund, released in 2001. This was the band's first album to chart at number one in Sweden.

Track listing
(English translation within parentheses)
"1002" – 0:55
"Dansa efter min pipa" – 3:19 ("Dance to My Pipe")
"Sista beställningen" – 2:39 ("Last Orders")
"Papperstrumpeten" – 4:26 ("The Paper Trumpet")
"F.ö. stal hon mitt hjärta" – 3:18 ("By the Way, She Stole My Heart")
"Och där står du" – 2:23 ("And There You Stand")
"En som stretar emot" – 4:09 ("One Who Is Resisting")
"Glöm allt du lärt dig" – 3:10 ("Forget All You've Learned")
"Ner på jorden" – 3:14 ("Down to Earth")
"Skall du hänga med? Nä!!" – 2:49 ("Are You Coming Along? Nah!!")
"Stora tankar i lilla berg- och dalbanan" – 3:58 ("Big Thoughts in the Little Rollercoaster")
"Våffeljärnet" – 2:40 ("The Waffle Iron")
"Invandraren" – 2:42 ("The Immigrant")

Charts

References

2001 albums
Bob Hund albums